Whiskey Tango Foxtrot may refer to:

Television
 "Whiskey Tango Foxtrot" (NCIS), a season eleven (2013) episode of the television series NCIS
 Whiskey Tango Foxtrot (Scandal), an episode of American television series Scandal
 "Whiskey-Tango-Foxtrot", a 2003 episode of the television series Jake 2.0
 "Whiskey Tango Foxtrot", a season three (2011) episode of The Good Wife
 Whiskey Tango Foxtrot, name adopted by cast members of The Real World: Hollywood for performing as a comedy troupe in season twenty

Other uses
 Whiskey Tango Foxtrot (film), a 2016 film starring Tina Fey
 Whiskey Tango Foxtrot (novel), the 2014 debut novel by David Shafer
 Whiskey Tango Foxtrot, a 2007 memoir of photographer Ashley Gilbertson's time covering the war in Iraq

See also 
 WTF (disambiguation)